This is a list of all the United States Supreme Court cases from volume 396 of the United States Reports:

External links

1969 in United States case law
1970 in United States case law